The University of Wisconsin–Madison Badgers have drafted 308 players into the National Football League (NFL) since the league began holding drafts in 1936. The Badgers' highest draft position was second overall in 1944, when Pat Harder was selected by Card-Pitt. Wisconsin's first drafted player in the NFL was Eddie Jankowski, who was the 9th overall pick by the Green Bay Packers in 1937. Five former Badgers were selected from the latest NFL draft: Leo Chenal, Logan Bruss, Jake Ferguson, Matt Henningsen and Faion Hicks.

Each NFL franchise seeks to add new players through the annual NFL Draft. The team with the worst record the previous year picks first, the next-worst team second, and so on. Teams that did not make the playoffs are ordered by their regular-season record, with any remaining ties broken by strength of schedule. Playoff participants are sequenced after non-playoff teams, based on their round of elimination (wild card, division, conference, and Super Bowl).

Before the AFL–NFL merger agreements in 1966, the American Football League (AFL) operated in direct competition with the NFL and held a separate draft. This led to a massive bidding war over top prospects between the two leagues. As part of the merger agreement on June 8, 1966, the two leagues would hold a multiple round "Common Draft". Once the AFL officially merged with the NFL in 1970, the "Common Draft" simply became the NFL Draft. This list includes players that have transferred to or from Wisconsin.

Key

Selections

American Football League

National Football League

Notable undrafted players

Note: No drafts held before 1936

Notes

References
General

 
 
 
 
 

Specific

Wisconsin Badgers

Wisconsin Badgers
Wisconsin Badgers NFL Draft